Heritage Pharmaceuticals Inc. is a manufacturer of generic pharmaceuticals based in Eatontown, New Jersey, United States, and established in 2006.

The company was involved in a 2014 congressional inquiry about the rising price of doxycycline hyclate initiated by Elijah Cummings and Bernie Sanders. 

In December 2016, it was accused of conspiracy to raise the price of the antibiotic doxycycline and diabetes drug glyburide in 20 US states after investigations by Connecticut's Attorney General. Mylan, Teva Pharmaceuticals USA Citron Pharma, India's Aurobindo Pharma and Australia's Mayne Pharma are alleged to be part of the conspiracy. The US Department of Justice brought criminal charges against former Chief Executive Officer Jeffrey Glazer and former Vice President of Commercial Operations Jason Malek for price fixing. The company fired them in August 2016 and have now also brought civil proceedings against them, alleging that they stole tens of millions of dollars from the company over at least seven years using at least five dummy corporations to siphon off Heritage's profits through numerous racketeering schemes, including  $466,000 in profit in one day.   It is alleged that the price of 500 doxycycline tablets rose in the US from $20 to $1,849 in just seven months.

See also
 Biotech and pharmaceutical companies in the New York metropolitan area

References

Pharmaceutical companies based in New Jersey
Generic drug manufacturers
Companies based in Monmouth County, New Jersey
2006 establishments in New Jersey
Pharmaceutical companies established in 2006
Eatontown, New Jersey